Sleep ∞ Over is an American indie rock and experimental pop project founded by Stefanie Franciotti. The project began in 2010 when Franciotti released a self titled tape on Night People Records  with collaborators Christa Palazzolo and Sarah Brown. When the latter two left, Franciotti continued to record under the name. She released Casual Diamond in 2011 on the Hippos in Tanks label, followed by her first full album, Forever, later that same year.

Franciotti told Dummy in regards to the breakup with her former bandmates:  “I wanted to see the songs I had written [happen]. The whole experience was pretty soul-crushing at the time but we’re all over it now.”

In 2013, Franciotti released “I Want to Be Alone” and “Rooftop” on Hippos in Tanks.

Discography
ST (2010)
Outer Limits (2010)
Casual Diamond (2011)
Forever (2011)
 I Want To Be Alone (2013)
 Rooftop (2013)
 Don’t Wanna Hide (2016)

References

Experimental pop musicians
Musicians from Austin, Texas
American indie rock groups
Musical groups established in 2010
2010 establishments in Texas